Baldwinsville Central School District is a public school district which serves the community of Baldwinsville, New York. The superintendent is Jason D. Thomson. The district office address is 29 East Oneida Street Baldwinsville, NY 13027. It consists of 6,036 students in eight schools in this grade span (five K–5 elementary schools, one 6–7 middle school, one 8–9 junior high school, and one 10–12 senior high school).

Schools

Elementary (K-5)
 Harry E. Elden Elementary School
Martin Van Buren Elementary School
Catherine M. McNamara Elementary School
Mae E. Reynolds Elementary School
L. Pearl Palmer Elementary School

Middle (6-7)
 Donald S. Ray Middle School

Junior High (8-9)
Theodore R. Durgee Junior High School
Principal: Thomas Fraher
Assistant Principals: Laurie Turton, John Courain

Senior High (10-12)
Charles W. Baker High School
Principal: Kris Denton
Assistant Principals: William Allan, Jennifer Terpening, Margaret McRobbie-Taru

External links
School District Webpage 

School districts in New York (state)
Education in Onondaga County, New York